Jim Jewitt (5 February 1933 – 25 July 1990) was an  Australian rules footballer who played with St Kilda in the Victorian Football League (VFL).

Notes

External links 

1933 births
1990 deaths
Australian rules footballers from Victoria (Australia)
St Kilda Football Club players
West Footscray Football Club players